Göwe is a river of Mecklenburg-Vorpommern, Germany. It flows into the Warnow near Kuhlen-Wendorf.

See also
List of rivers of Mecklenburg-Vorpommern

Rivers of Mecklenburg-Western Pomerania
Rivers of Germany